HMS Princess Amelia was an 80-gun third rate ship of the line of the Royal Navy, designed by Sir Joseph Allin and built at Woolwich Dockyard by Israel Pownoll to the draught specified by the 1745 Establishment, and launched on 7 March 1757.

She participated in the 1781 Battle of Dogger Bank under the command of Captain Macartney with reduced masts and guns.

Princess Amelia was lent to the Board of Customs in November 1788, and thereby deleted from the Navy List. She arrived at Sheerness on 24 March 1818 from Stangate Creek. The Admiralty then sold her on 11 June 1818 to a Mr. Snooks for £2,610.

Notes

References

Lavery, Brian (2003) The Ship of the Line – Volume 1: The development of the battlefleet 1650–1850. Conway Maritime Press. .

Ships of the line of the Royal Navy
1757 ships